Miraflores is a barrio in the municipality of Añasco, Puerto Rico. Its population in 2010 was 567.

Hurricane Maria
The barrio of Miraflores became inaccessible when Hurricane Maria hit Puerto Rico on September 20, 2017 and caused landslides and destruction. Five months after the hurricane struck, engineers and officials were grappling with the massive amounts of repairs that were needed to PR-109 in Añasco and multiple other areas of this barrio and of Añasco, as a whole.

Features and demographics

Sectors
Barrios (which are like minor civil divisions) in turn are further subdivided into smaller local populated place areas/units called sectores (sectors in English). The types of sectores may vary, from normally sector to urbanización to reparto to barriada to residencial, among others.

The following sectors are in Miraflores barrio:

.

Special communities
Since 2001 when law 1-2001 was passed, measures have been taken to identify and address the high levels of poverty and the lack of resources and opportunities affecting specific communities in Puerto Rico. Initially there were 686 places that made the list. The places on the list are barrios, communities, sectors, or neighborhoods and in 2004, Miraflores had made the list.

See also

 List of communities in Puerto Rico
 List of barrios and sectors of Añasco, Puerto Rico

References

Barrios of Añasco, Puerto Rico